Larry Morrow is an American serial entrepreneur and author.

Early life and education 
Morrow is African-American by ethnicity and grew up in a Korean-American family in New Orleans, Louisiana. He was raised by his mom and Korean grandmother who were both entrepreneurs. He attended St. Augustine High School and graduated from Bonnebel High. He also attended Tulane University but dropped out to support his family.

Career 
Morrow started a career in New Orleans as an entrepreneur. He founded "Larry Morrow Events", an entertainment business platform that has featured celebrities such as Diddy, Floyd Mayweather, Drake, Rick Ross, Meek Mill and others. Morrow also launched "Larry Morrow Properties" and  a New Orleans-based restaurant named "Morrow's". He wrote and published a self-help book captioned All Bets On Me – the Risks and Rewards of Becoming an Entrepreneur.

Awards and recognition 
 2018 – Black Enterprise – BeModern Man
 2019 – Biz New Orleans – New & Notable Award

References

External links 
  Larry Morrow Events website

African-American company founders
American company founders
Living people
American writers
Businesspeople from New Orleans
American people of Korean descent
Year of birth missing (living people)
21st-century African-American people